Julian Evans is an Australian writer and presenter.

In 1990 he left his office job to become a writer and spent six months travelling among the islands of the south Pacific Ocean. In 1992 he published Transit of Venus: Travels in the Pacific. This launched him on a career as a writer of books, travel articles, essays, and radio and television documentaries on literary subjects. He is also a translator and a reviewer for a number of newspapers and magazines, including the Guardian, Daily Telegraph, Times Literary Supplement and Prospect. His most recent full-length book was Semi-Invisible Man: the Life of Norman Lewis (2008), which was reviewed favourably; Evans wrote about writer and adventurer Norman Lewis after he described Evans's first book, Transit of Venus, as "far and away the best book about the Pacific of our times."

Works
Semi-Invisible Man: the Life of Norman Lewis (Jonathan Cape, June 2008, Picador June 2009)
I sotteranei del Vaticano: rereading André Gide’s Les Caves du Vatican (Metauro Edizioni, Pesaro 2006)
"Remettez-moi ça" ("Really very fortunate"), La Revue Littéraire vol.1 no.1, April 2004
"Un gâchis" ("A waste"), L'Atelier du Roman no. 29, March 2002
José Saramago: A Life of Resistance (BBC Four film), 2002
The Romantic Road (BBC Radio 3 20-part radio series), 2000-2
Transit of Venus: Travels in the Pacific (Secker & Warburg 1992, Pantheon 1992 (US); revised edition Eland Books 2014)

References

Living people
Australian writers
Year of birth missing (living people)